The 1986–87 season of the Venezuelan Primera División, the top category of Venezuelan football, was played by 15 teams. The national champions were Marítimo.

Results

Oriental Group

Occidental Group

Final stage

External links
Venezuela 1987 season at RSSSF

Ven
Ven
Venezuelan Primera División seasons
1986–87 in Venezuelan football